Cutting Edge Haunted House is a haunted house attraction located in an abandoned meat packing factory in Fort Worth, Texas. It was opened in October, 1991. It utilizes old machinery from when the building was a meat packing plant as part of its attraction. 

Guinness World Records recorded the attraction as "The World's Largest Haunted House" four times. The attraction received a record in Guinness World Records for "World's Largest Walk Through Haunted House".

Description

Cutting Edge Haunted House was built in a 100-year-old abandoned meat packing plant in a section of Fort Worth that had once been referred to as "Hell's Half Acre." The meat packing equipment is still in use as a "two-story human conveyor system". Mannequins are hoisted up to the second level and brought through the entire meat packing process until the conveyor system brings the "butchered corpses" back to the first level. It includes live sets, animations, and dozens of live actors inside and outside the building. The average duration of the experience is 45 to 55 minutes. The attraction totaled around  linearly as of 2009.

Awards

Guinness World Record

In 2009, Cutting Edge held the Guinness World Record for the "Longest Walk-through Horror House". A Guinness judge measured the distance of the attraction and validated it as the longest walk-through haunted house on record. Cutting Edge was again awarded Guinness Records in 2015, for both the longest and largest haunted house.

Other awards
2021 #1 for USA Today Best Haunted Attraction.
2015, 2016 Voted "Top 13 Haunted House" by HauntedHouses.com.
2015 Fifth scariest haunted house by Fox News Travel.
2014 Fifth Craziest, Scariest Haunted Attraction by E! Online.
2012 Fourth longest haunted house in America by Hauntworld.com.
2009-2015 Voted number 8 in "Top 13 Haunted Houses in America" by Hauntworld Magazine.
2008-2015 Voted "Top 13 Haunted House In America" by Hauntworld Magazine.
2008-2015 Voted number 5 in the nation of "The 13 Best Haunts for Halloween" by US Airways Magazine.
2007-2015 Voted "Top 5 Haunted House in America" by HauntedHouseRatings.com 
1991-2014 Multiple winner of "Texas Best Haunted House".

References

External links
 

Haunted attractions (simulated)
Tourist attractions in Fort Worth, Texas
Guinness World Records